Balthasar Klossowski de Rola (February 29, 1908 – February 18, 2001), known as Balthus, was a Polish-French modern artist. He is known for his erotically charged images of pubescent girls, but also for the refined, dreamlike quality of his imagery.

Throughout his career, Balthus rejected the usual conventions of the art world. He insisted that his paintings should be seen and not read about, and he resisted any attempts made to build a biographical profile. Towards the end of his life, he took part in a series of dialogues with the neurobiologist Semir Zeki, conducted at his chalet at Rossinière, Switzerland and at the Palazzo Farnese (French Embassy) in Rome. They were published in 1995 under the title La Qûete de l'essentiel  and in it he gives some of his views on art, painting and some painters. See also Ref.

Biography

Early years
Balthus was born in Paris, in 1908, to Prussian expatriate parents. His given name was Balthasar Klossowski – his sobriquet "Balthus" was based on his childhood nickname, alternately spelled Baltus, Baltusz, Balthusz or Balthus.

His father, Erich Klossowski, was an art historian who wrote a noted monograph on Honoré Daumier. Erich grew up in the town of Ragnit in East Prussia, now part of Russia but then in the German Empire. According to Balthus he belonged to the former Polish petty nobility (the drobna szlachta) and his family bore the Rola coat of arms. This largely undocumented family background would later be appropriated by Balthus when he decided to use the surname "Klossowski de Rola". (Had he lived in Poland, the arrangement of the name would have been Rola-Kłossowski or Kłossowski h. Rola). Balthus had the Rola arms embroidered onto many of his kimono, in the style of a Japanese .

Balthus's mother Elisabeth Dorothée Spiro Klossowska (known as Baladine Klossowska) was descended from Russian Jews who had emigrated to East Prussia. In the catalogue of the Metropolitan Museum of Art's 1984 Balthus exhibition, she was described as the daughter of a cantor from Korelitz in Novogrudok district in the Russian Empire. However, Balthus told his biographer Nicholas Fox Weber that this was erroneous, and that his mother came "apparently from a Protestant family in the south of France". But according to Weber, this was a confabulation on Balthus's part. In fact, Balthus would often embroider upon his story of his mother's ancestry, saying that she was also related to the Romanovs and the Narischkins, powerful aristocratic families of Russia. In another confabulatory twist, Weber reports that Baladine's lover, the poet Rainer Maria Rilke, had said that the Spiros were descended from one of the richest families of Sephardic Jews, that is that they were of Spanish, not Eastern European origin. Weber doubted this story too, since Balthus's son Fumio, born in the late 1960s, had Tay–Sachs disease, a genetic disorder commonly associated with Eastern European Jews.

 

Balthus's older brother Pierre Klossowski (1905 - 2001) became a noted writer and philosopher.

The Klossowski children grew up in an art-world environment, with frequent visits to their household by famous artists and writers, including Rilke, André Gide (who mentored Pierre), and Jean Cocteau (who would depict the family in scenes of his 1929 novel Les Enfants Terribles). The artists Maurice Denis and Pierre Bonnard were also visitors. The children had a Scottish nanny, and Balthus would later say that his first language was English, although his parents spoke German to one another.

Overall, Balthus had an idyllic memory of these early childhood years, which were disrupted when, shortly after the First World War began in 1914, the family were forced to leave Paris in order to avoid deportation due to their German citizenship. They settled first in Switzerland, later in Berlin.

In 1917 his parents separated, and his mother moved with the two boys to Geneva. They lived in a modest flat at 11, rue Pré-Jérôme, a comfortable neighborhood. About a year later his mother became the lover of Rilke. Rilke was very impressed with the young "Baltusz"'s artistic talent, and helped him to publish his first work in 1921, at the age of 13. This was a book titled Mitsou which included forty drawings by Balthus and a preface by Rilke. The comic-book-style pictures depicted the story of a young boy who loses his beloved cat. The themes of the story foreshadowed Balthus's lifelong fascination with cats, along with a feeling of loss or disappearance.

At Christmas of 1921, Baladine, financially destitute, moved to Berlin with her children in order to live with her brother.

Young adulthood
In 1926 Balthus visited Florence, where he copied many frescos by the Renaissance master Piero della Francesca. This inspired an early ambitious work of his: the tempera wall paintings of the Protestant church of the Swiss village of Beatenberg which he executed in 1927.

From 1930 to 1931 Balthus served in the French army in Morocco. He was drafted into the Moroccan infantry in Kenitra and Fes, worked as a secretary, and sketched his painting La Caserne (1933).

In 1933 he moved to Paris, taking a studio in the Rue de Furstemberg. Later he would move to another studio at the nearby Cour de Rohan. Balthus showed no interest in modernist styles such as Cubism. His paintings were realistic but introverted, in the manner of the second generation of Surrealist painters such as Salvador Dalí, who often used realistic techniques to depict psychological motifs or dream images. Balthus often depicted pubescent girls in erotic and voyeuristic poses. One of the most notorious works from his first exhibition in Paris was The Guitar Lesson (1934), which caused controversy due to its sadistic and sexually explicit imagery. It depicts a young girl arched on her back over the lap of her female teacher, whose hands are positioned on the girl as if to play her like a guitar: one hand near her exposed vulva, and the other hand grasping her hair. Other works from the same exhibition included The Street (1933), Cathy Dressing (1933) and Alice (1933).

 

Early on his work was admired by writers and fellow painters, especially by André Breton and Pablo Picasso. His circle of friends in Paris included the novelists Pierre Jean Jouve, Antoine de Saint-Exupéry, Joseph Breitbach, Pierre Leyris, Henri Michaux, Michel Leiris and René Char, the photographer Man Ray, the playwright and actor Antonin Artaud, and the painters André Derain, Joan Miró and Alberto Giacometti (one of the most faithful of his friends). In 1948, another friend, Albert Camus, asked him to design the sets and costumes for his play L'État de Siège (The State of Siege, directed by Jean-Louis Barrault). Balthus also designed the sets and costumes for Artaud's adaptation for Percy Bysshe Shelley's The Cenci (1935), Ugo Betti's Delitto all'isola delle capre (Crime on Goat-Island, 1953) and Barrault's adaptation of Julius Caesar (1959–1960).

In 1937 he married Antoinette de Watteville, who was from an influential aristocratic family from Bern. He had met her as early as 1924, and she was the model for the aforementioned Cathy Dressing and for a series of portraits. Balthus had two children from this marriage, Stanislas (born 1942) and Thaddeus Klossowski (born 1944), who recently published books on their father, including the letters by their parents. Stanislas, known as "Stash", became a figure in swinging London and Paris in the 1960s.

Champrovent to Chassy
In 1940, with the invasion of France by German forces, Balthus fled with his wife Antoinette to Savoy to a farm in Champrovent near Aix-les-Bains, where he began work on two major paintings: Landscape near Champrovent (1942–1945) and The Living Room (1942). In 1942, he escaped from Nazi France to Switzerland, first to Bern and in 1945 to Geneva, where he became a friend of the publisher Albert Skira as well as the writer and member of the French Resistance, André Malraux. Balthus returned to France in 1946 and a year later traveled with André Masson to Southern France, meeting figures such as Picasso and Jacques Lacan, who eventually became a collector of his work. With Adolphe Mouron Cassandre in 1950, Balthus designed stage decor for a production of Mozart's opera Così fan tutte in Aix-en-Provence. Three years later he moved into the Chateau de Chassy in the Morvan, living with his step-niece Frédérique Tison and finishing his large-scale masterpieces La Chambre (The Room 1952, possibly influenced by Pierre Klossowski's novels) and Le Passage du Commerce Saint-André (1954).

Later years

As international fame grew with exhibitions in the gallery of Pierre Matisse (1938) and the Museum of Modern Art (1956) in New York City, he cultivated the image of himself as an enigma. 
In 1964, he moved to Rome where he presided over the Villa de Medici as director (appointed by the French Minister of Culture André Malraux) of the French Academy in Rome. He became a friend of the filmmaker Federico Fellini and the painter Renato Guttuso.

In 1977, he moved to Rossinière, Switzerland. That he had a second, Japanese wife Setsuko Ideta whom he married in 1967 and was thirty-five years his junior, simply added to the air of mystery around him (he met her in Japan, during a diplomatic mission also initiated by Malraux). A son, Fumio, was born in 1968 but died two years later.

The photographers and friends Henri Cartier-Bresson and Martine Franck (Cartier-Bresson's wife) both portrayed the painter and his wife and their daughter Harumi (born 1973) in his Grand Chalet in Rossinière in 1999.

Balthus was one of the few living artists to be represented in the Louvre, when his painting The Children (1937) was acquired from the private collection of Pablo Picasso.

He co-authored a book of dialogues with the neurobiologist Semir Zeki, entitled La Quête de l'essentiel.

He died in Rossinière, Switzerland. Prime ministers and rock stars alike attended his funeral. Bono, lead singer of U2, sang for the hundreds of mourners at the funeral, including the President of France, the Prince Sadruddhin Aga Khan, supermodel Elle Macpherson, and Cartier-Bresson.

Style and themes
Balthus's style is primarily classical. His work shows numerous influences, including the writings of Emily Brontë, the writings and photography of Lewis Carroll, and the paintings of Masaccio, Piero della Francesca, Simone Martini, Poussin, Jean-Étienne Liotard, Joseph Reinhardt, Géricault, Ingres, Goya, Jean-Baptiste-Camille Corot, Courbet, Edgar Degas, Félix Vallotton and Paul Cézanne. Although his technique and compositions were inspired by pre-Renaissance painters, there also are eerie intimations of contemporary surrealists like de Chirico. Painting the figure at a time when figurative art was largely ignored, he is widely recognised as an important 20th-century artist.

Many of his paintings show young girls in an erotic context. Balthus insisted that his work was not erotic but that it recognized the discomforting facts of children's sexuality. In 2013, Balthus's paintings of adolescent girls were described by Roberta Smith in The New York Times as both "alluring and disturbing".

Influence and legacy

His work has influenced several contemporary artists, notably Duane Michals and Émile Chambon. He has also influenced the filmmaker Jacques Rivette of the French New Wave, whose film Hurlevent (1985) was inspired by Balthus's drawings made at the beginning of the 1930s: "Seeing as he's a bit of an eccentric and all that, I am very fond of Balthus (...) I was struck by the fact that Balthus enormously simplified the costumes and stripped away the imagery trappings (...)".

His widow, Setsuko Klossowska de Rola, heads the Fonds Balthus, the archives of the painter, which is accessible to the scholars as a long term deposit in the Museum of Fine Arts in Lausanne.

A reproduction of Balthus's Girl at a Window (a painting from 1957) prominently appears in François Truffaut's film Domicile Conjugal (Bed and Board, 1970). The two principal characters, Antoine Doinel (Jean-Pierre Léaud) and his wife Christine (Claude Jade), are arguing. Christine takes down from the wall a small drawing of about 25×25 cm and gives it to her husband: Christine: "Here, take the small Balthus." Antoine: "Ah, the small Balthus. I offered it to you, it's yours, keep it."

During December 2017, a public petition was circulated requesting that Balthus's painting Thérèse Dreaming be removed from display at the Metropolitan Museum of Art in New York due to its alleged explicit content and suggestive portrayal. Philip Kennicott, writing for The Washington Post on 5 December 2017, in an article titled "This painting might be sexually disturbing. But that's no reason to take it out of a museum", summarized the museum's long-standing position against censorship. The painting had previously been on display at the Museum Ludwig in Cologne, Germany in 2007 without incident.

In popular culture
 South African novelist Christopher Hope wrote My Chocolate Redeemer around a painting by Balthus, The Golden Days (1944), which appears on the book jacket.
 Stephen Dobyns's book The Balthus Poems (Atheneum, 1982) describes individual paintings by Balthus in 32 narrative poems.
 Harold Budd's 1988 album The White Arcades includes a track titled "Balthus Bemused by Color".
 Robert Dassanowsky's book Telegrams from the Metropole: Selected Poems 1980–1998 includes "The Balthus Poem".
 Thomas Harris's book Hannibal (1999, Delacorte Press) says that the character Hannibal Lecter, a psychiatrist, cannibal, and genius, is Balthus's cousin.
 William Minor's book The Balthus Poems (Coracle, 2018) is a minimalist, absurdist approach to his life and work.
 Joyce Carol Oates's 2018 book Beautiful Days: Stories contains the story "Les beaux jours," which contains lyrical descriptions of Balthus's paintings and imagines the life of an eleven-year-old model of Balthus.
 Maya Hawke's 2022 single "Thérèse" from her second studio album Moss is inspired by Balthus's painting entitled "Thérèse Dreaming".
 The UK print edition of Philip Pullman's short work The Collectors features Portrait de la jeune fille en costume d'amazone (1932) by Balthus as a cover image and inside print. The UK adult cover of Northern Lights (Pullman novel)  also features another work by Balthus, Girl in Green and Red (1944).

Exhibitions
Balthus held his first exhibition at Galerie Pierre, Paris, in 1934. Following the ensuing scandal, he exhibited at the Pierre Matisse Gallery, New York, from 1938 to 1977, although he never visited the United States. Balthus's first major museum exhibition was at the Museum of Modern Art in 1956. Other museum exhibitions of note include Musée des Arts Decoratifs, Paris (1966); Tate Gallery, London (1968); La Biennale di Venezia (1980); Museum of Contemporary Art, Chicago (1980); Musée cantonal des beaux-arts de Lausanne (1993); Musée d'Art Moderne de la Ville de Paris (1984, traveled to Metropolitan Museum, Kyoto);  Metropolitan Museum of Art, New York (1984); and Palazzo Grassi, Venice (2001). "Balthus: Cats and Girls: Paintings and Provocations" at the Metropolitan Museum of Art (September 25, 2013 – January 12, 2014) was the first U.S. museum survey of the artist's work in 30 years. A major retrospective overseen by the artist's wife, Ideta Setsuko, was held in 2014 at the Tokyo Metropolitan Art Museum. An exhibition of Polaroid photographs taken by Balthus at the Museum Folkwang in Essen, Germany, was canceled over accusations of pedophilia. The German newspaper Die Zeit called the images, which depict a model named Anna from ages eight to 16, “documents of pedophile greed.”

Since then, despite attempts, no planned exhibition of Balthus’s work was censored or cancelled for such allegations.

Films on Balthus
 Damian Pettigrew, Balthus Through the Looking Glass (72', Super 16, PLANETE/CNC/PROCIREP, 1996). Documentary on and with Balthus filmed at work in his studio and in conversation at his Rossinière chalet. Shot over a 12-month period in Switzerland, Italy, France and the Moors of England.

References

Bibliography

 Aubert, Raphaël (2005). Le Paradoxe Balthus. Paris: Éditions de la Différence
 Balthus (2001). Correspondance amoureuse avec Antoinette de Watteville: 1928–1937. Paris: Buchet/Chastel
 Clair, Jean and Virginie Monnier (2000). Balthus: Catalogue Raisonné of the Complete Works. New York: Harry N. Abrams, Inc.
 Davenport, Guy (1989). A Balthus Notebook. New York: Ecco Press
 Neret, Gilles (2003). Balthus. New York: Taschen
 Klossowski de Rola, Stanislas (1996). Balthus. New York: Harry N. Abrams, Inc.
 Rewald, Sabine (1984). Balthus. New York: Harry N. Abrams, Inc.  /  (pbk.)
 Roy, Claude (1996). Balthus. Paris: Gallimard
 Vircondelet, Alain (2001). Mémoires de Balthus. Monaco: Editions du Rocher
 Von Boehm, Gero (author) and Kishin Shinoyama (photographer) (2007). The Painter's House. Munich: Schirmer/Mosel
 Weber, Nicholas Fox (1999). Balthus, a Biography. New York: Alfred A. Knopf.

Further reading
 David Bowie, "The Last Legendary Painter", Modern Painters, Autumn 1994, pp. 14–33.

External links

 Le Fonds Balthus
 
 Ten Dreams Galleries
 
 On Jacques Rivette's Wuthering Heights and Balthus's influence
 Balthus Obituaries
 The Great Cat: Cats in Art-Balthus-Balthasar Klossowski (1908–2001)

1908 births
2001 deaths
Painters from Paris
20th-century French painters
20th-century French male artists
20th-century Polish male artists
French male painters
French people of Russian-Jewish descent
Modern painters
Polish male painters
French erotic artists
Polish erotic artists
Recipients of the Praemium Imperiale
Cat artists
Honorary Members of the Royal Academy